The Rugby Football Union Midland Division is a rugby union governing body for the English Midlands and is part of the Rugby Football Union.

Constituent Bodies
 East Midlands
 Leicestershire
 North Midlands
 Notts, Lincs & Derbyshire
 Staffordshire
 Warwickshire

Leagues

It organises the following leagues:

Midlands Premier (tier 5)
Midlands 1 East (6)
Midlands 1 West (6)
Midlands 2 East (North) (7)
Midlands 2 East (South) (7)
Midlands 2 West (North) (7)
Midlands 2 West (South) (7)
Midlands 3 West (North) (8)
Midlands 3 West (South) (8)
Midlands 3 East (North) (8)
Midlands 3 East (South) (8)
Midlands 4 West (North) (9)
Midlands 4 West (South) (9)
Midlands 4 East (North) (9)
Midlands 4 East (South) (9)
Midlands 5 West (North) (10)
Midlands 5 West (South) (10)

Cups
Clubs also take part in the following national cup competitions:
RFU Intermediate Cup
RFU Senior Vase
RFU Junior Vase

See also
London & SE Division
Northern Division
South West Division
English rugby union system

References

External links
Midlands Rugby Union

Midlands